Reina Regente was the name of two Spanish cruisers:

, launched in 1887 and wrecked in 1895
, launched in 1906 and broken up for scrap in 1926

Spanish Navy ship names